Chris Philipps (born 8 March 1994) is a Luxembourgian international footballer who plays for Wiltz 71 as a defender.

Career

Club career
Born in Wiltz, Philipps has played club football in France and Germany for Metz B, Metz and SC Preußen Münster. He moved to Polish club Legia Warsaw on 2 February 2018. In the beginning of January 2020, he moved to Belgian Belgian First Division B club Lommel SK. He later returned to Luxembourg with Wiltz 71.

International career
During 2011 and 2012, Philipps competed in qualifying matches for the 2012 UEFA European Under-19 Football Championship and 2013 UEFA European Under-21 Football Championship. He made his senior international debut for Luxembourg in 2012.

References

1994 births
Living people
Association football defenders
Luxembourgian footballers
Luxembourg international footballers
FC Metz players
SC Preußen Münster players
Legia Warsaw players
Lommel S.K. players
FC Wiltz 71 players
3. Liga players
Ligue 1 players
Ligue 2 players
Championnat National players
Championnat National 2 players
Championnat National 3 players
Ekstraklasa players
Challenger Pro League players
Luxembourgian expatriate footballers
Expatriate footballers in France
Expatriate footballers in Germany
Expatriate footballers in Poland
Expatriate footballers in Belgium
Luxembourgian expatriate sportspeople in France
Luxembourgian expatriate sportspeople in Germany
Luxembourgian expatriate sportspeople in Poland
Luxembourgian expatriate sportspeople in Belgium